In trademark law, Sieckmann v German Patent and Trademark Office (case C-273/00) issued on December 12, 2002, is widely recognised as a landmark decision of the European Court of Justice on the graphical representation of non-conventional trademarks under the European Trade Marks Directive.

The case involved a "methyl cinnamate" scent, which the applicant had described "as balsamically fruity with a slight hint of cinnamon". The ECJ ruled that (a) a chemical formula depicting this scent did not represent the odour of a substance, was not sufficiently intelligible, nor sufficiently clear and precise; (b) a written description was not sufficiently clear, precise and objective; and (c) a physical deposit of a sample of the scent did not constitute a graphic representation, and was not sufficiently stable or durable.

The case illustrates difficulties with the graphical representation of scent marks, as the ECJ held that these representations, whether individually or collectively, could not satisfy this requirement.

External links
 The decision
 The opinion of Advocate General Ruiz-Jarabo Colomer
 Non-conventional trademarks directory
 Fresh version of Non-conventional trademarks directory 

Trademark case law
Court of Justice of the European Union case law
2002 in case law
German case law
2002 in Germany